The Milwaukee Road Freight House in Rapid City, South Dakota, United States, was built by the Chicago, Milwaukee, St. Paul and Pacific Railroad (also known as The Milwaukee Road) in 1923 to store and ship freight. The building is single storey, rectangular, and constructed of brick. Offices were placed at one end with warehouse space occupying the rest of the building. Large freight doors and bays are along each side. The circa 1915 depot is located east of the freight house.

The Milwaukee Road built its line from eastern South Dakota to Rapid City in 1906-07. With the increase of tourists in the late 1910s, the railroad built the freight house. It was built of brick. The design was a modern one, based on other early 20th century commercial buildings. When The Milwaukee Road went bankrupt and abandoned its lines in South Dakota in 1980, it sold the freight house to local businesses for use as offices.

The freight house was placed on the National Register of Historic Places because of its association with The Milwaukee Road and railroad development in South Dakota.

References
Geiger, Lee. Milwaukee Road Freight House (Pennington County, South Dakota) National Register of Historic Places Registration Form, 1989. On file at the National Park Service.

Chicago, Milwaukee, St. Paul and Pacific Railroad
Industrial buildings and structures on the National Register of Historic Places in South Dakota
Buildings and structures in Rapid City, South Dakota
Railway buildings and structures in South Dakota
Railway freight houses on the National Register of Historic Places
National Register of Historic Places in Pennington County, South Dakota
Railway buildings and structures on the National Register of Historic Places in South Dakota
Industrial buildings completed in 1923
1923 establishments in South Dakota